Diana Chan (born 1988) is a Malaysian-born Australian cook. She is the winner of MasterChef Australia for 2017, having defeated Ben Ungermann by one point in the grand finale.

Early life 
Chan was raised in Johor Bahru, Malaysia, where she attended Convent Johor Bahru. She is the youngest of three children, having learned to cook by watching her parents prepare Peranakan and Cantonese food.  At age 17, Chan moved to Kuala Lumpur to complete her Cambridge A levels. Upon matriculation, she moved to Melbourne, Victoria, Australia where she completed a Bachelor of Commerce degree at Deakin University in 2010. After qualifying as a chartered accountant, she subsequently worked for Deloitte as a senior analyst.

MasterChef Australia 
Chan was selected in the Top 24 to contest MasterChef Australia in 2017. Her use of mystery box ingredients resulted in her being in the top 3 for tasting on three occasions, one of which she won. She was also in the top 3 for invention tests on two occasions, winning once. Chan captained her team to win the first team challenge of the year. Her dishes were the most tasted in the competition.

Chan won the 2017 competition on 24 July 2017, by one point over runner-up Ben Ungermann. She plans to use her $250,000 prize to open a restaurant serving wholesome meals with fusion flavours and Malaysian influences. Since winning Masterchef she has been working to promote tourism in Malaysia, launched her column in Delicious Magazine, and has been seen demonstrating her cooking at many events in Melbourne and Malaysia. Chan supports Beyond Blue.

Chan will host Asia Unplated with Diana Chan which will premiere on 19 December 2019.

References

External links

Living people
Participants in Australian reality television series
Reality cooking competition winners
MasterChef Australia
People from Johor Bahru
People from Melbourne
Australian people of Chinese descent
Australian people of Malaysian descent
Australian television chefs
Australian accountants
1988 births